Sir Richard Musgrave, 3rd Baronet (c. 1675 – 11 October 1711) was an English baronet and politician.

He was a Member of Parliament (MP) for Cumberland in 1701, and from 1702 to 1708.

He succeeded to the baronetcy, of Hayton Castle, in 1710.

References 

1675 births
Year of birth uncertain
1711 deaths
Baronets in the Baronetage of Nova Scotia
English MPs 1701
English MPs 1702–1705
English MPs 1705–1707
Members of the Parliament of Great Britain for English constituencies
British MPs 1707–1708